Richard Walter Barton (22 November 1911 – 29 June 1990) was a South African boxer who competed in the 1932 Summer Olympics.

He was born in Germiston and died in Johannesburg.

In 1932 he was eliminated in the quarter-finals of the welterweight class after losing his bout to the upcoming gold medalist Edward Flynn.

At the 1934 Empire Games he won the silver medal in the welterweight class after losing the final to Dave McCleave.

External links
sports-reference.com

1911 births
1990 deaths
Sportspeople from Germiston
Welterweight boxers
Olympic boxers of South Africa
Boxers at the 1932 Summer Olympics
Boxers at the 1934 British Empire Games
Commonwealth Games silver medallists for South Africa
South African male boxers
Commonwealth Games medallists in boxing
South African people of British descent
Medallists at the 1934 British Empire Games